Hiroshima FM is an FM and Teletext radio station in Hiroshima for around Seto Inland area.

The station was founded on February 27, 1982, and went on the air on December 5, 1982.

It is the 9th nongovernmental FM radio station in Japan, and a member of Japan FM Network.

Frequencies
Hiroshima Bay - 78.2 MHz
Ōsakikamijima - 76.4 MHz
Onomichi - 77.1 MHz
Higashihiroshima - 77.8 MHz
Hiroshima North - 80.4 MHz
Hiroshima West - 81.3 MHz
Sera - 81.4 MHz
Kure - 81.7 MHz
Fukuyama - 82.1 MHz
Hiroshima Mountain - 82.3 MHz
Miyoshi - 83.5 MHz
Fuchū - 85.5 MHz
Kitahiroshima - 86.3 MHz

Hiroshima FM Broadcasting Co., Ltd.
 is the owner of the station. Its stakeholders are:

 Hiroshima Toyo Carp - 14.25%
 Chugoku Shimbun - 8.1%
 Hiroshi Matsuda - 7.1%
 Tokyo FM - 5%

Studios
HFM HQ studio
Kamiya-cho Shareo studio
Futaba-Tosho TERA satellite studio
YYY studio
DEODEO Neverland Fukuro-machi FMDJ studio

External links
Hiroshima FM

Mass media in Hiroshima
Radio stations in Japan
Companies based in Hiroshima Prefecture
Hiroshima Toyo Carp